Bilton is a surname. Notable people with the surname include:

 Alan Bilton, British academic and novelist
 Caroline Bilton (born 1976), British television presenter
 Flo Bilton (1921–2004), English association football coach and administrator
 Greg Bilton (born 1965), Lieutenant-General in the Australian Army
 James Bilton (1908–1988), Canadian politician
 John Bilton, English football coach and former player
 Michael Bilton (1919–1993), British actor
 Nick Bilton, British non-fiction author